Malaysian Indian Justice Party (abbrev: MIJP) is a political party representing the Indian community  in Malaysia. It is a relatively new party, was among the latest 20 new parties registration approved by the Registrar of Society (RoS) and just received permission to operate as a political party in 2013. The party is pro-Barisan Nasional (BN) coalition party and even campaigned for BN in the 2018 Malaysian general election (GE14). The party is closely related to Ahmad Zahid Hamidi, BN Deputy Chairman then.

See also 
 Politics of Malaysia
 List of political parties in Malaysia

References

External link 
 

Political parties in Malaysia
Political parties established in 2013
2013 establishments in Malaysia
Conservative parties in Malaysia
Political parties of minorities
Identity politics
Indian-Malaysian culture